"It's a Long Way to Berlin, but We'll Get There!" is a World War I era song released in 1917. Arthur Fields wrote the lyrics. Leon Flatow composed the music. Leo Feist, Inc. of New York City published the song. Rosenbaum Studios designed the sheet music cover. It features soldiers marching in formation. There is an inset photo of Maurice Burkhardt, Will J. Ward, Ed Morton, Jimmy Flynn, Willie Weston, or Francis Maguire that varies per edition. There is another version of the cover known as the "Popular edition". It features a photo of Henry Bergman.

The American Quartet recorded the song with conductor Rosario Bourdon. The bass vocals were John H. Meyer and William F. Hooley. The tenor vocals were Billy Murray and Albert Campbell. It was recorded on September 26, 1917 and released under the Victor Record label. Arthur Fields also recorded a version of the song, which was released in 1918 under Edison Blue Amberol.

The song was instantly successful upon its release. It was reminiscent of the 1912 British war song, "It's a Long Way to Tipperary".

The sheet music can be found at the Pritzker Military Museum & Library.

The song is about Rueben Plank, a "husky Yank", who enlists in the army. He is determined to "get that Kaiser Bill". The chorus is what Corporal Plank and his squad sings, directed to Kaiser Wilhelm II:

References

External links
 "It's a Long Way to Berlin, but We'll Get There!" at the Illinois Digital Archives

1917 songs
Songs about Berlin
Songs of World War I
Songs with lyrics by Arthur Fields
Victor Talking Machine Company singles